Castelnuovo di Conza is a town and comune in the province of Salerno in the Campania region of southwestern Italy. The town suffered heavy damage in the 1980 earthquake of Irpinia, but has since been rebuilt.

External links

Official website

Cities and towns in Campania
Localities of Cilento